Susanna Hoffs is the second solo album by Susanna Hoffs. The style of the album is more folk-oriented than her earlier work. Columbia Records disagreed with this style and dropped her from their roster, resulting in Hoffs signing to London Records.  Three songs rejected by Columbia appeared on this album including "Enormous Wings", "Darling One" and "Happy Place". Another one, "Catch the Wind", appeared on the CD single release of "All I Want".  "All I Want" hit #77 on the Billboard Hot 100 and spent twelve weeks on the charts.

The album is much more personal and deals with issues like abusive relationships and insecurities; "Weak With Love" is about John Lennon's assassination. The album was promoted by forming a band for an extensive tour.

The album was released to enthusiastic reviews but, like its predecessor, it failed to sell as well as expected. AllMusic Review's Stephen Thomas Erlewine stated this album is "a remarkably accomplished and catchy collection of mature jangle-pop, power-pop and ballads."   Wook Kim of Entertainment Weekly noted Hoffs "performs a small act of bravery."

Track listing

Personnel
Susanna Hoffs – vocals, guitar, producer
David Baerwald – guitar, keyboards, percussion, backing vocals, producer
Jon Brion – guitar, bass, keyboards, percussion, drums
Bill Bink – guitar
Charlotte Caffey – guitar
Jason Falkner – guitar, bass, organ, keyboards, drums, percussion, chimes
David Kitay – guitar, percussion, producer
Larry Klein – guitar, bass
Greg Leisz – guitar
Mark Linkous – guitar, banjo
Linda Perry – guitar, backing vocals
Anders Rundblad – guitar
Jeff Trott – guitar
Davey Faragher – bass, backing vocals
Dan Schwartz – bass
Chris Fudurich – keyboards, assistant engineer
Kevin Gilbert – keyboards
Bruce Kaphan – pedal steel guitar
Bill Bottrell – cello, percussion, backing vocals
Thomas Caffey – strings, engineer
Curt Bisquera – drums, percussion
Lenny Castro – percussion
Mick Fleetwood – drums
Jim Keltner – drums
Brian McCleod – drums, percussion
Jeremy Stacey – drums
Michael Urbano – drums
Julie Christiansen – backing vocals
Sally Djorosky	– backing vocals
Petra Haden – backing vocals
Rachel Haden – backing vocals
Matt Wallace – producer, engineer
Jack Joseph Puig – producer, engineer, mixing
Ken Alydice – engineer
Jim Champagne – engineer, assistant engineer
Paul DuGre – engineer
Jerry Jordan – engineer
Michael Letho – engineer
Clif Norrell – engineer
Jim Scott – engineer
Noel Hazen – assistant engineer
Tom Nellen – assistant engineer
John Paterno – assistant engineer
Phillip Dixon – photography
Matthew Sweet – backing vocals

References

1996 albums
Susanna Hoffs albums
London Records albums